Oishi Shinkage-ryū (大石神影流) is a traditional school (koryū) of Japanese martial arts, founded by Oishi Susumu Tanetsugu in the early 1800s.

History 
The origin of Oishi Shinkage-ryū was Aizu Kage-ryū kenjutsu (swordsmanship), which was founded by Aizu Ikōsai Hisatada. Aizu Kage-ryū was transmitted to founder by Murakami Ittō. He came to Yanagawa domain from Ōoka domain. He taught Aizu Kage-ryū kenjutsu, Oshima-ryū sōjutsu (use of spear) and Okuyama Shinkan-ryū jujutsu. One of his student was Oishi Yuken who was a grandfather of Oishi Susumu. Oishi Yuken taught Oishi Susumu his kenjutsu and sōjutsu arts. Both Susumu's grandfather and his father were instructors of Yanagawa domain.

Oishi Susumu improved the protective gear used during practice. In addition, he improved fukuro shinai (bamboo sword covered with leather) to a modern bamboo sword. He devised stab technique, and a technique of striking one's opponent's breastplate. He was said to be five foot eleven inches tall (1.8 meters), a great height for a Japanese of his day. Therefore, his style of swordsmanship uses longer bamboo practice swords than most other styles. There are stories of him engaging in combat around Japan using his four shaku shinai (about 121 cm).

By the order of his feudal lord, he went to the capital city, Edo in 1832. In the next year, he did kenjutsu matches with many famous instructors. After Oishi Susumu, his son, also named Oishi Susume, inherited the school. Because the latter didn’t have a son, his younger brother, Oishi Yukie was placed as the headmaster of the ryū. After the Meiji Restoration, they didn’t practice swordsmanship for some time, but the school survived still. When Oishi Yukie died, his son, Oishi Hajime was young, so Itai Masumi, the pupil of Oishi Yukie protected the Oishi Shinkage-ryū. After Oishi Hajime grew up, he inherited his father's martial art. He taught the ryū to his grandson, Oishi Eiichi. And Oishi Eiichi taught the Oishi Shinkage-ryū to Morimoto Kunio. Morimoto Kunio was given menkyo kaiden (a teaching license) and is currently teaching the Oishi Shinkage-ryū.

Lineage 

Early history pre-dating Oishi Shinkage-ryū:
 Aizu Ikōsai (Founder of the school that Oishi Susumu learned)
 Okuyama Saemondayu
 Kamiizumi Musashinokami
 Masunaga HakuenNyudo
 Yoshida Masuemon
 Ishihara Denjizaemon
 Murakami Ittou
 Oishi Yuken
 Oishi Tarobei

After founding of the school:
 Oishi Susumu Tanetugu (Founder of the Oishi Shinkage-ryū)
 Oishi Susumu Tanemasa
 Oishi Yukie
 Itai Masumi
 Oishi Hajime
 Oishi Eiichi
 Morimoto Kunio

Technical characteristics 

Oishi Shinkage-ryu is a traditional school of swordsmanship. The features of the Oishi Shinkage-ryū are techniques called morotezuki (to make a both hands pass), katatezuki (to make a single hand pass) and dōgiri (to cut the waist). These techniques were used by Oishi Susumu for the first time in swordsmanship matches with the protective gear. Oishi Susumu made 79 kata, which are called tekazu in Oishi Shinkage-ryū.

Techniques of the Oishi Shinkage-ryu kenjutsu include use of one sword with both hands, techniques to use two swords, saya-no-uchi (iai) and naginata. The first three groups of kata is the basis of the ryū.

Shiaiguchi （試合口） 

 Isshin
 Mumyouittou
 Suigetsu
 Suken
 Ichimi

Youno omote （陽之表：表拾本） 

 Youken
 Gekken
 Muniken
 Nishou
 Inazuma
 Taiyouken
 Seitouken
 Muiken
 Norimi
 Chidori

Younoura （陽之裏） 

 Seiryu
 Sachin
 Jumonji
 Harimi
 Yoyami
 Rankyoku
 Kurai
 Kyokuman
 Ootoshi
 Byako

Sangakuen-no-tachi （三學圓之太刀） 

 Ittouryoudan
 Santan
 Saitetsu
 Hankai
 Hankou
 Usen
 Saten
 Choutan
 Ichimi

Yari awase （槍合） 

 Irikake
 Uchikomi

Naginata awase （長刀合） 

 Koran
 Hiryu

Bō awase （棒合） 

 Uchiawase
 Uchiiri
 Enzan

Saya-no-uchi （鞘之内） 

 Nukiuchi
 Koteotoshi
 Uken
 Saken
 Kabutowari

Nitō （二刀） 

 Seifu
 Ayanochoushi
 Momijigasane
 Kasumi
 Ariake

Tengu-no-shou （天狗抄） 

 Hishou
 Gyakufu
 Ransetsu
 Takanami
 Jyoboku
 Sasetsudan
 Sasetsudan
 Enki
 Marubashi
 Orihakou

Kodachi （小太刀） 

 Mouko
 Kotsubogaeshi
 Engetu
 Jyushi
 Kyoujyaku

Shindensaiso （神傳截相） 

 Enpi
 Enkai
 Yamagata
 Tsuikage
 Ukifune
 Uranami
 Rangyou
 Matsukaze
 Kasha
 Chotan
 Tettei
 Isononami
 seigan

See also
 Shinkage-ryū

References

External links 

 

Ko-ryū bujutsu